Sousaichnium is an ichnogenus of dinosaur footprint.

See also

 List of dinosaur ichnogenera

References

Dinosaur trace fossils
Ornithopods